Annie Chandler may refer to:

 Annie Lavery, a fictional character on ABC's daytime drama All My Children
 Annie Chandler (swimmer) (born 1987), American swimmer